Serath is a hamlet in Saskatchewan.

Unincorporated communities in Saskatchewan
Longlaketon No. 219, Saskatchewan
Division No. 6, Saskatchewan